Bailo is a municipality located in the province of Huesca, Aragon, Spain. According to the 2004 census (INE), the municipality has a population of 256 inhabitants.

Villages
Bailo 
Larués
Arrés
Alastuey 
Arbués
Paternoy
Especiello
Gabás
Huértalo
Pequera
Nueveciercos
Chas 
Villamuerta

References

Municipalities in the Province of Huesca